Prince Alexander of the Netherlands, Prince of Orange-Nassau (William Alexander Frederick Constantine Nicholas Michael, ; 2 August 1818 – 20 February 1848) was born at Soestdijk Palace, the second son to King William II of The Netherlands and Queen Anna Paulovna, daughter of Tsar Paul I of Russia.  He was nicknamed Sasha within his family.

Biography
Prince Alexander was born on Sunday, 2 August 1818 at a quarter past ten in the morning. His birth was announced the next day in the Nederlandsche Staatscourant. To commemorate the birth of his second grandson William I of the Netherlands gave his daughter-in-law Anna Pavlovna the Czar Peter House in Zaandam, which had been inhabited by her ancestor Peter I of Russia during his stay in the Dutch Republic.
Prince Alexander was christened on the forty-sixth birthday of his grandfather, 24 August 1818, by the Reverend Krieger in The Hague. The young Prince's paternal great-grandmother Wilhelmina of Prussia was present for the occasion. Alexander received the names of his maternal uncles Alexander I of Russia, Grand Duke Constantine Pavlovich of Russia, Nicholas I of Russia and Grand Duke Michael Pavlovich of Russia.

Alexander was educated together with his brother William III of the Netherlands, who was only eighteen months his senior. Their father, the Prince of Orange, thought the physical education of the boys particularly important. As such they spent much time outdoors. The Prince of Orange actively partook in the upbringing of his children. On 22 October 1822 Anna Pavlovna wrote to her brother Constantine, "the two eldest are big boys and are receiving their first lessons. William started to teach them to read a year ago and now they have been entrusted to the care of a tutor who comes everyday to teach them. Papa teaches them Geography." The Princes William and Alexander later continued their studies at Leiden University, but neither of them showed a particular interest in academics. Alexander did develop an interest in Numismatics
From early childhood on Alexander was his parents' favorite son. They saw him as more fit to rule than his brother William. Alexander had inherited his father's easy going nature. He had a large group of friends and even managed to get on reasonably well with his sister-in-law Sophie of Württemberg. The latter had a difficult relationship with her in-laws, in particular with Anna Pavlovna. Alexander was also known for his sense of humor, as he once appeared for a costume ball dressed from head to toe in shining armour.

Alexander was the first member of the House of Orange to have his photograph taken, and he was also the first to own a bicycle.

Alexander's greatest attachments were hunting and horses. He received his first horse at the age of ten and became a skilled horseman. At Het Loo he bred Frisian horses. Alexander was also passionate hunter. In 1839 he and his brother were permitted by their grandfather the King to reinstate the old practice of falconry at Het Loo. The two brothers created the Royal Loo Hawking Club, with Alexander, as protector of the hawking sport, serving as chairman. They gathered a company of international nobility at Het Loo. Apart from hunting the company also engaged in horse races (Queen Anna Pavlovna once gave him a horse brought from England for 4000 Dutch guilders) and shooting contests. A letter to the Prince's father proves how seriously Alexander took his hunting activities, as he explained his absence from The Hague: "I so desire to stay at Het Loo, where the falconry is wonderful this year. You might disapprove of my behaviour and my decision, my dear father, but remember, beloved father, this is my only relaxation and the only pleasure I truly love." After Alexander's death the expensive sport came to an end and in 1855 the curtain fell for the Royal Loo Hawking Club.

For one who did not particularly care for seafaring, Alexander travelled a great deal. This included several visits to the United Kingdom, and longer journeys to Italy and his mother's native country. On 23 July 1839 Alexander travelled to Russia to visit his maternal uncle Tsar Nicholas I, accompanied by his mentor Major Rigot de Beguins. On 26 August 1839 the Tsar named his nephew Chief of a Novorossiysk Draagoon Regiment. On 3 October Anna Pavlovna wrote to Tsar Nicholas thanking him for his kindness to her son: "How I should thank you, dear friend, for the gifts you have bestowed upon my son Alexander and for the flattering honour you so mercifully bestowed upon him by making him the head of a regiment of your army. May he once deserve the honour to be taken up in the ranks of such an army! May he be worth it!"  Like his father, Alexander occasionally appeared at court in Russian uniform.

In 1846, Alexander accompanied his mother and sister Princess Sophie of the Netherlands to Italy. The company left Rotterdam on 26 August 1846 and arrived at Domodossola on 11 September. At the end of September they reached Genoa where Prince Henry's ship lay moored. On 9 October the Queen, Alexander and Sophie reached Rome. They visited the Pope Pope Pius IX and the Protestant prince knelt to receive his blessing. Alexander returned to The Netherlands in November.

As an adult, Prince Alexander lived rather modestly. Aide-de-camp Eliza Pieter Matthes in 1842 described the prince's home behind the Kloosterkerk as "rather small for a prince", but the interior was "charming."  In 1844, Alexander bought villa Boschlust in The Hague after the death of the former inhabitant Johannes van den Bosch. Alexander relocated to villa Boschlust in 1845, but stayed for only two years, until his departure to Madeira. After his death the villa was inherited by his parents. Anna Pavlovna inhabited Boschlust for a short time after the death of her husband (The widowed queen fled her former home, Kneuterdijk Palace in tears when she visited one last time). Soon afterwards, the Queen dowager also left Boschlust. The villa was sold in March 1851. Villa Boschlust was demolished shortly after 1888.

Career

As the Prince of Orange's second son, Alexander was destined for a career in the army. On 2 August 1828, for his tenth birthday, Alexander received the rank of colonel by Royal Order. He originally started his military career in the Navy, but soon switched to the Cavalry. With his father and brother William, Alexander joined the campaign against Belgium in 1833-4. Being an excellent horseman, Alexander from 1840 on served as Lieutenant-General and Inspector of the Cavalry, a position he took very seriously. Eliza Pieter Matthes, aide-de-camp to King William II, recalled a conversation he had with Alexander about the cavalry: "I had the impression he was quite knowledgeable about that weapon [the cavalry]. It is a shame he is only our Inspector-General in name, we would not be worse off if he would be so [inspector-general] effectively." Prince Alexander held the positions of Lieutenant-General and Inspector-General from 1840 until his death. The Regiment Huzaren Prins Alexander is named for him.

In the Autumn of 1844, King William II planned to name his second son Governour-General of the Dutch East Indies. Many people, including Minister of Colonies Jean Chrétien Baud, objected, and in the end Alexander did not receive the commission.

Marriage prospects
In the late 1830s, William IV of the United Kingdom wished to marry Alexander to his niece Princess Alexandrina Victoria of Kent (and future Queen of the United Kingdom). Nothing came of this however, as Victoria remarked to her uncle Leopold I of Belgium, "The Netherlander boys are very plain and have a mixture of Kalmuck (Mongol) and Dutch in their faces, moreover they look heavy, dull, and frightened and are not at all prepossessing. So much for the Oranges, dear Uncle."

It was suggested in 1840 that Alexander should eventually marry Isabella II of Spain when she came of age, allowing him to become regent.  However, opposition from other crowns and King William’s objection to her religion (she was Catholic) prevented any marriage between the two. Alexander never married, as Princess Sophie wrote to Lady Malet on 4 May 1847, "but I am in pleasant company with Prince Alexander[...]It is not that he courts me, for he does not yet know what a woman is, but he gives me all friendship he is able to give." He had no issue.

Declining health and death

Charlotte Disbrowe, daughter to the British diplomat Sir Edward Cromwell Disbrowe (1790–1851), recalled how in November 1836 eighteen-year-old Alexander suffered a serious accident that could easily have cost him his life. During a frightening storm, "he and his eldest brother were returning from Leiden, where they went most days to pursue their studies. The road through the wood was so entirely blocked that they were obliged to abandon their carriage and proceed on foot. As they reached the part of the wood nearest to The Hague the trees were falling on all sides [...] one fell from a direction from which they did not expect it. The Baron seized hold of the Hereditary prince who was walking right next to him and pulled him out of danger, but Prince Alexander was caught by the branches and thrown down. It was some time before help was obtainable to extricate him, for it had to be done by digging away the ground." After the branches had been removed, Alexander, bleeding and unconscious, was carried back to the palace. "At first," wrote Disbrowe, "he was not much hurt, but after some hours fever and delirium set in, and he was very seriously ill." Alexander never fully recovered from this accident, frequently suffering from breathlessness and headaches for the rest of his life.

Disbrowe later commented on the prince's declining state of health: "Prince Alexander, a very fine young man, born in 1818, was evidently failing in health. Whether he had been injured in any way by the tree that fell on him, or whether he had done harm to himself by trying to reduce himself to jockey weight, I know not, but he was six feet four inches in height, the latter experience would have needed vigorous treatment. Often when dancing with him I noticed how breathless he was, and how the perspiration stood out in beads on his forehead, and I wished I had the courage to beg him to stop." 
Alexander was constantly dieting and exercising to maintain his slim figure. He rarely spared himself any exhaustion, and tried to hide his physical weakness from his family.

Alexander, however, failed to hide his problems forever. On 23 April 1847 Princess Sophie remarked to Lady Malet about her brother-in-law's health problems: "Prince Alexander is also ill now. Some kind of exhausting illness, consumption. I don't know what [it is] exactly, but he walks like an old man and his glands are swollen. He has been staying at Het Loo for a month, but there has been no improvement." On 3 June she continued: "I made long rides with him face to face and listened to his complaints about his health and his problems. Sometimes I thought to myself, it is just like being alone with an old woman."
Alexander contracted tuberculosis and for health reasons relocated in November 1847 to the drier climes of Madeira, Portugal. After an emotional farewell from his family, he was taken to Rotterdam where he embarked on the final journey of his life. Prince Henry of the Netherlands commanded the flagship 'Prince of Orange' and two escortships 'Cerberus' and 'Cyclops' that brought Alexander to Madeira. On the island Henry met his future wife Amalia of Saxe-Weimar-Eisenach when she and her mother came to visit Alexander.

Alexander moved into the villa Quinta Vigia on the outskirts of Funchal, which is currently the official residence of the President of the Regional Government of Madeira. He died there on 20 February 1848 at the age of 29. Because of an unfavourable wind the news of his death only reached his parents a month later, reportedly while King William II was posing for a portrait. 
Alexander's sister-in-law Sophie wrote to Lady Malet on 24 March: "Our poor prince Alexander died like he lived; until the last moment his thoughts were filled with horses and sports. He had no idea of the nearing end. The autopsy showed his lungs were perfectly healthy, the stomach destroyed, there was not a drop of blood in his body." The death of their favorite son hit the King, who was in the middle of a political crisis, particularly hard. He lamented: "We walk as if on graves. The earth is nothing but a big grave, that devours all greatness, honour and glory". The Queen wrote to her brother Nicholas on 30 March: "Only today I feel strong enough to write some lines to tell you about the terrible disaster that has befallen us. Our Sasja is dead! and we have survived that blow.... He is at peace now, but we have to go on in this world, where he had no enemies, he who for me was the most loving of sons and the most loyal of companions." The Queen later had many of her son's possession brought to Soestdijk, including his two hunting dogs, Charon and Ditch, whom she visited on his birthday and the anniversary of his death.

Prince Alexander was buried in the royal crypt at Nieuwe Kerk in Delft on Good Friday 21 April 1848 in a peculiar turtle-shaped coffin. His brothers Henry and William, Prince of Orange were the only members of the royal family to attend the funeral. The future King William III until 1859 moved the celebrations of his birthday to that of his wife (17 June) because his own birthday (19 February) was too close to the date of his brother's death.

Honours
  Kingdom of Prussia: Knight of the Order of the Black Eagle, 4 December 1834
 : Grand Cross of the Royal Guelphic Order, 1836

Military ranks
Royal Netherlands Army
 Colonel (2 August 1828 until death)
 Commander, Grenadiers' Guard Regiment

Royal Netherlands Cavalry
 Major-General (2 August 1839 until 1840)
 Lieutenant-General (1840 until death)
 Inspector-General (1840 until death)

Imperial Russian Cavalry
 Chief, Novorossiysk Dragoon Regiment (26 August 1839 – 19 March 1848)

Ancestry

References

Sources
 
 
 
 
 
 
 
 
 
 In naam van Oranje, 30. Vijf eeuwen de Oranjes en hun sport en jacht (1994) Nationaal Museum Paleis Het Loo. Zwolle: Waanders (in Dutch)
 In naam van Oranje, 33. Vijf eeuwen de Oranjes en de onbekende oranjeprinsen (1995) Nationaal Museum Paleis Het Loo. Zwolle: Waanders (in Dutch)

External links

 Royal House of the Netherlands and Grand-Ducal House of Luxembourg

1818 births
1848 deaths
Dutch members of the Dutch Reformed Church
House of Orange-Nassau
Burials in the Royal Crypt at Nieuwe Kerk, Delft
People from Soest, Netherlands
Princes of Orange-Nassau
Recipients of the Order of the Netherlands Lion
Sons of kings